On 23 May 2022, eleven people were killed in a mass shooting at the Gala Hotel and a nearby bar in Celaya, Guanajuato, Mexico.

At about 10 p.m. CDT on 23 May 2022, 15 hooded gunmen from the Santa Rosa de Lima Cartel stormed the Gala Hotel in Celaya. The hotel had a bar at street level, which they stormed into and killed two men and women. The gunmen then entered a bar across the street and killed another man and five women. They reportedly threw molotov cocktails, and torched the hotel, starting a fire which was later put out. One person died in hospital, bringing the total to eleven, with eight women and three men. The attackers left a message on a piece of cardboard referring to the Jalisco New Generation Cartel and three dismembered bodies which were found hours before the attack.

References

2022 mass shootings in Mexico
2022 murders in Mexico
21st century in Guanajuato
21st-century mass murder in Mexico
Attacks on bars
Attacks on buildings and structures in 2022
Attacks on buildings and structures in Mexico
Attacks on hotels in North America
Crime in Guanajuato
Massacres in 2022
Massacres in Mexico
May 2022 crimes in North America
May 2022 events in Mexico
Battles of the Mexican drug war
Organized crime conflicts in Mexico
Organized crime events in Mexico
Violent non-state actor incidents in Mexico
Attacks in Mexico in 2022